The 1928 Big Ten Conference football season was the 33rd season of college football played by the member schools of the Big Ten Conference (also known as the Western Conference) and was a part of the 1928 college football season.

The 1928 Illinois Fighting Illini football team, under head coach Robert Zuppke, compiled a 7–1 record, won the Big Ten championship, led the conference in scoring defense (2.0 points allowed per game), and was ranked No. 7 in the Dickinson System rankings. Tackles Albert J. Nowack and Russell Crane and guard Leroy Wietz were selected as first-team All-Americans.

The 1928 Wisconsin Badgers football team, under head coach Glenn Thistlethwaite, compiled a 7–1–1 record and was ranked No. 4 in the Dickinson System rankings. Guard Rube Wagner was selected as a first-team All-Big Ten player.

The 1928 Minnesota Golden Gophers football team, under head coach Clarence Spears, compiled a 6–2 record, finished third in the Big Ten, and led the conference in scoring offense (23.9 points per game). Guard George Gibson and end Ken Haycraft were named All-Americans by the Associated Press and Look Magazine. Gibson, Haycraft and quarterback Frederick L. Hovde received first-team All-Big Ten honors.

The 1928 Iowa Hawkeyes football team, under head coach Burt Ingwersen, compiled a 6–2 record and was ranked No. 6 in the Dickinson System rankings. Halfback Willis Glassgow received first-team All-Big Ten honors.

Indiana halfback Chuck Bennett received the Chicago Tribune Silver Football trophy as the most valuable player in the conference.  Northwestern's triple threat star Walt Holmer finished second in close voting for the trophy; Bennett received eight of 22 first place votes, and Holmer received seven.

Season overview

Results and team statistics

Key
DS = Rankings from Dickinson System. See 1928 college football season
PPG = Average of points scored per game
PAG = Average of points allowed per game
MVP = Most valuable player as voted by players on each team as part of the voting process to determine the winner of the Chicago Tribune Silver Football trophy

Regular season

Bowl games
No Big Ten teams participated in any bowl games during the 1928 season.

All-Big Ten players

The following players were picked by the Associated Press (AP), the United Press (UP), and/or Walter Eckersall (WE) as first-team players on the 1928 All-Big Ten Conference football team.

All-Americans

Two Big Ten players were selected as consensus first-team players on the 1928 College Football All-America Team. They were:

Other Big Ten players received first-team honors from at least one selector. They were:

References